Halaç District   is a district of Lebap Province in Turkmenistan. The administrative center of the district is the town of Halaç.

History
Initially founded in 1925 with the same name, it is part of Kerkin Region of the Turkmen SSR. When Kerkin was abolished five years later, precisely at September 1930, Halaç became directly subordinate to the Turkmen government. 

In February 1933, Kerkin was restored and Halaç became part of it. In November 1939, Halaç moved to the newly formed Chardzhou region.

In December 1943, the Halachsky district moved to the newly formed Kerkin region.

In January 1947, Kerkin was abolished and Halaç returned to the Chardzhou region.

In January 1963, the first Halaç was abolished. February 1975 saw Halaç's restoration as part of the Chardzhou region.

On December 14, 1992, Halaç became part of Lebap.

On November 25, 2017, the territory of the Halaç included the territory of Garabekewül which was abolished by the Parliament of Turkmenistan.

Districts of Turkmenistan
Lebap Region